The Ülemiste Tunnel is a road tunnel in Tallinn, Estonia. It is located southeast of the city centre near the Lake Ülemiste. The tunnel connects Peterburi Road (Tallinn–Narva Road, part of E20) with Järvevana Road (part of the inner beltway). It opened on 9 October 2013. It is the only road tunnel of its kind in Estonia.

References

External links 
 

Buildings and structures in Tallinn
Tunnels in Estonia
Tunnels completed in 2013
Transport in Tallinn
Road tunnels